The Gemini Giant is a landmark statue on U.S. Route 66 at the eastern entrance to Wilmington, Will County, Illinois. Standing outside the Launching Pad drive-in restaurant, the 30 foot tall statue is one of many giant "Muffler Man" advertising props found throughout the US in the Sixties. The Gemini Giant is named after the Gemini space program and holds a silver "rocket ship" in his hands, while sporting an astronaut's space helmet that resembles a welding mask.

The proprietors of a Dari-Delight restaurant (opened in 1960), John and Bernice Korelc, bought a 438-pound fiberglass Muffler Man figure for $3,500 at the annual National Restaurant Association convention, had it outfitted as an astronaut with helmet and rocket, and renamed the restaurant, now guarded by the Gemini Giant, as the "Launching Pad". Since then, the Giant has been the most prominent decoration of the restaurant.

In 2007, the Launching Pad was purchased from Jerry and Sharon Gatties, the owners at the time, by Morey Szczecin, but, after a struggle, the landmark closed again in 2010. In October 2017, it was purchased by Holly Barker and Tully Garrett, who announced plans to restore it "to what it was in its glory days," with the Gemini Giant remaining as a recognized Route 66 landmark. 

Both the Launching Pad and the Gemini Giant were inducted into the Illinois Route 66 Hall of Fame in 2000.

References

External links

Buildings and structures on U.S. Route 66
Roadside attractions in Illinois
U.S. Route 66 in Illinois
Buildings and structures in Will County, Illinois
Tourist attractions in Will County, Illinois